The village of Silecroft in Cumbria, England, is in the parish of Whicham. It is situated between the towns of Millom and Bootle, and also neighbours the towns/villages of Haverigg, Kirksanton and Whitbeck.

The village is located just within the Lake District National Park.

Black Combe

Black Combe, is a fell  near Silecroft, which on clear days has views of  Ireland, Scotland, Wales, Isle of Man, nearby is White Combe. The main walking route is from St Mary's Church, Whicham, the routes up the hill are well-trodden and easy to follow..

Silecroft railway station

Silecroft has its own railway station,  a request stop on the scenic Cumbrian Coast Line.

Governance
Silecroft is in the parliamentary constituency of Copeland, Trudy Harrison is the Member of Parliament. For Local Government purposes it is in the Black Combe & Scafell ward of  the Borough of Copeland and Millom Without of Cumbria County Council. The local planning authority is the Lake District National Park Authority. Silecroft does not have its own parish council; instead it's part of Whicham Parish Council.

See also

References

Villages in Cumbria
Whicham